Rubicordifolin is a natural product that is produced by Rubia cordifolia, a plant of the family Rubiaceae. The molecule is isolated from the roots of Rubia cordifolia and was first characterized in 1993. In 2004, the first synthesis of rubicordifolin was accomplished. The molecule has been shown to have cytotoxic properties in vitro.

Biosynthesis
A biosynthetic pathway for rubicordifolin has not yet been elucidated. However, it has been hypothesized that the dimerization of the two naphthoquinone units yields rubicordifolin.  Naphthoquinones can be traced back to the shikimate pathway in plants. Shikimate is converted into chorismic acid, which is further converted into 2-succinylbenzoic acid through a TPP-dependent reaction.

After 2-succinylbenzoic acid has been produced, a cyclization, a prenylation, a methylation, and an oxidation occur which yields a naphthoquinone.

Once this naphthoquinone has been made, a series of oxidations and cyclizations lead to two substrates that can undergo a [4+2] cycloaddition that leads to the product.

Synthesis 
The Trauner group at UC Berkeley completed a synthesis of rubicordifolin in 2004. The synthesis of the natural product, dubbed a “biomimetic” synthesis, takes inspiration from the proposed dimerization of two naphthoquinones units. Mechanistically, it is proposed that the phenylboronic acid promotes a cyclization that is followed by a Diels-Alder reaction to yield the final product.

Pharmacology 
Studies of rubicordifolin demonstrate it possesses both cytotoxic properties. When tested in vitro against Chinese hamster lung fibroblasts, human nasopharynx carcinomas, and lymphocytic leukemia cells, rubicordifolin exhibited cytotoxic activities (measured in IC50, μg/ml) of 4.7, 2.9, and 1.2 respectively.

References 

Polyphenols
Rubia